Gaspard van der Heyden (also known as Gaspar à Myrica) (c. 1496 – c. 1549) was a goldsmith, engraver, master printer and builder of precision astronomical instruments including terrestrial and celestial globes from Leuven, Belgium. He was well known among the humanists in Leuven as well as among scientists and mathematicians.

Life 
Gaspard was the son of the surgeon Peter van der Heyden and Katharina van den Berghe. He was born around 1496 in Leuven. He's recorded to have married his wife, Anna van Luye in 1521. Little of his early life and education are recorded, but he was considered to be more than an artist, an engraver, a highly qualified craftsman, and a metal worker. He certainly had scientific education, especially in mathematics.  A letter from Prof. Goglenius of Leuven dated December 2, 1531, to a friend of Erasmus, namely, to John Dantiscus, Polish policeman in the Netherlands, and great protector of Gemma Frisius, shows us that he and several other local humanists were friends of Erasmus. Goglenius thanks Dantiscus for a gift sent to him by Jaspar aurifex(Gaspard van der Heyden). The fact that the family name is not given makes it seem plausible that the goldsmith had a very good reputation among the Humanists in Leuven and the Court of Marius of Hungary. Unfortunately, Goclenius does not mention what type of object the gift was.

Metalwork and engraving 
Gaspard van der Heyden is referred to as "aurifaber" or goldsmith in demographic records starting in  1524. In city records from Leuven his name is mentioned several times. It's recorded that on 13 June 1526 he received a payment for the production of a copper seal intended for the payment of the beer tax; On August 31, 1526, he's recorded to have been commissioned to make a gilded silver chain, destined for a city musician. On August 17, 1527 he's shown to have made a Seal for the city, and on the following December 19, he's recorded to have repaired the chain of a city whistle. In 1531/32, he's commissioned to make a stamp for embossing cloth.

Van der Heyden was considered an important member of the Leuven geographic circle, and was noted by English scholar John Dee when he went abroad to speak with "some learned men, and chiefly Mathematicians, as Gemma Phrysius, Gerardus Mercator, Gaspar à Myrica [Gaspard van der Heyden], Antonius Gogava." In 1526 or 1527 he made a terrestrial and a celestial globe in collaboration with Franciscus Monachus of Mechelen. These globes have not survived, but are described by Monachus in a letter to his patron, entitled De Orbis Situ ac descriptione ad Reverendiss. D. archiepiscopum Panormitanum, Francisci, Monachi ordinis Franciscani, epistola sane qua luculenta. (A very exquisite letter from Francis, a monk of the Franciscan order, to the most reverend Archbishop of Palermo, touching the site and description of the globe.)

He built another terrestrial globe with the assistance of Gemma Frisius in 1529, but they planned a new globe by 1535 to better represent new geographical discoveries. The new globe was completed in 1536 with Gerardus Mercator who apprenticed under van der Heyden. A celestial globe was produced by Frisius, Mercator and van der Heyden in 1537. Copies of the newer globes were produced until the 1570s.  A legend engraved on the celestial globe reads "Made by Gemma Frisius, doctor and mathematician, Gaspar à Myrica [Van der Heyden], and Gerardus Mercator of Rupelmonde in the year of the virgin birth 1537."

On July 4, 1549, he received compensation for a five-day stay in Antwerp, where he bought a cup from the goldsmith, Matthieu van Campen. This gilded silver cup was then decorated with the coat of arms of the town, inscribed with the inscription "insignia oppidi Lovaniensis", and gifted to Philip II on 5 July 1549, when he received the most prestigious notables in Leuven.

See also

 Atlas Cosmographicae
 Celestial globe
 Franciscus Monachus
 Gemma Frisius
 Gerardus Mercator
 Globe
 Golden Age of Netherlandish cartography (also known as the Golden Age of Dutch cartography)
 History of cartography

Notes and references

Further reading

External links 
 Cartographic images of maps and globes
 The History of Cartography, Volume 3, The University of Chicago Press - PDF 
 The Discovery of Gerard Mercator's Astrolabes, G.L'E. Turner

16th-century cartographers
16th-century Dutch scientists
16th-century engravers
16th-century geographers
1496 births
1549 deaths
Dutch cartographers
16th-century Dutch inventors
Early modern Netherlandish cartography
Flemish cartographers
Flemish engravers
Scientists from Leuven